Euphorbia bongolavensis is a species of plant in the family Euphorbiaceae. It is endemic to Madagascar.  Its natural habitat is subtropical or tropical dry forests. It is currently being threatened by habitat loss.

References

Endemic flora of Madagascar
bongolavensis
Vulnerable plants
Taxonomy articles created by Polbot